Şebnem Bozoklu (born 25 August 1979) is a Turkish actress.

Her paternal family is from Isparta, while her maternal family is from Siirt and of Egyptian descent. Her family moved to Moda neighborhood in Istanbul and she spent most of her childhood in Kadıköy.

She graduated from Kadıköy Girls High School in 1996 and finished her education at the School of Fine Arts of Dokuz Eylül University in 2000. She started taking acting classes at Müjdat Gezen Art Center and finished her studies in 2004.

Between 2005 and 2006, she served as a director for the play Sanat Dansı ile Mondi''' at Çisenti Theatre. Later, between 2006–2007 she worked as a presenter on TRT's program Hazır Mısınız?. During the same period, she worked on another TRT program called Elma Kurdu as a soloist and puppeteer. Bozoklu's breakthrough came with her role in Canım Ailem as Meliha, for which she received a Golden Butterfly Award as Best Comedy Actress in 2009. In 2010, she was awarded at Radio-Television Journalists Association Oscars as Best Actress. Her other popular series are comedy crime Ulan İstanbul and crime drama Şahsiyet.

 Filmography 

 Theatre 
 Aşk Geçmişim, Uniq Hall, 2019
 A Streetcar Named Desire, BKM & ID Communications, 2017
 Kaplan Sarılması, Toy Istanbul, 2016
 Bezirgan, Istanbul People's Theatre, 2012
 Festen/Kutlama, DOT Theatre, 2011

 As assistant director 
 TiyatroKare, İki Oda Bir Sinan (2005–2006)
 Istanbul City Theatre, Ben Anadolu (2003–2004)

 Awards 
14th Kemal Sunal Culture and Art Week Awards, Best Stage Actress, (A Streetcar Named Desire), 2019
Istanbul Kültür University Awards, Most Admired Stage Actress of the Year, (A Streetcar Named Desire), 2018
Harbiye Leo Club Awards, Best Stage Actress (A Street Named Desire), 2018
Sadri Alışık Awards, Most Successful Actress of the Year (Comedy) (Albüm'')
2009 Golden Butterfly Awards - Best Comedy Actress

References

External links 
 
 

1979 births
Actresses from Istanbul
Dokuz Eylül University alumni
Turkish television actresses
Turkish stage actresses
Turkish film actresses
Living people
Turkish people of Arab descent